Amour Patrick Tignyemb (born 14 June 1985) is a Cameroonian professional footballer who plays as a goalkeeper.

Club career
Tignyemb formerly played for Coton Sport and Tonnerre Yaoundé.

International career
Tignyemb was part of the Cameroonian 2004 African Nations Cup team, who finished top of their group in the first round of competition, before losing in the quarter finals to Nigeria. Tignyemb also competed at the 2008 Summer Olympics. He earned his first senior cap for his homeland on 9 February 2005 against Senegal national football team.

References

External links
 

Living people
1985 births
Association football goalkeepers
Cameroonian footballers
Cameroonian expatriate footballers
Cameroon international footballers
Footballers at the 2008 Summer Olympics
Olympic footballers of Cameroon
South African Premier Division players
Coton Sport FC de Garoua players
Tonnerre Yaoundé players
Bloemfontein Celtic F.C. players
Chippa United F.C. players
Expatriate soccer players in South Africa
2004 African Cup of Nations players